Clémence Botino (born 22 January 1997) is a French model and beauty pageant titleholder who was crowned Miss France 2020. She represented France at Miss Universe 2021, where she placed in the top ten.

Early life and education

Passionate about fashion, she became interested in music during her adolescence and became a pianist then dancer, especially in salsa. 

She obtained a scientific baccalauréat with mention "very good" in 2014. At the age of 17, she lived for a year in the United States and studied costume in an international school located in Miami, to perfect her English.

After two years of preparatory literary courses at the Lycée Gerville-Réache, she moved to Paris in 2018 to study in the third year of a license and then in the first year of a master's degree in art history at the Sorbonne University; she specializes in the study of fashion history with the ambition, at the time of her election of Miss France, to become a heritage curator.

Pageantry

Miss Guadeloupe 2019
On 3 August 2019, she was elected Miss Guadeloupe, succeeding Ophély Mézino.

Miss France 2020

On 14 December 2019, at the Dôme de Marseille, Clémence Botino was crowned Miss France 2020 with 31.95% of the public vote, narrowly winning ahead of Lou Ruat (Miss Provence) with 30.66%. She succeeds Vaimalama Chaves, Miss France 2019, and becomes the third Miss Guadeloupe elected Miss France after Véronique de la Cruz in 1993 and Corinne Coman in 2003. Before her election, it was revealed in early December that Clémence Botino arrived first in the test of general culture of the Miss France competition, with a mark of 17.5 out of 20. She ended her reign as Miss France on 19 December 2020 after crowning Amandine Petit as her successor during Miss France 2021, held at Puy du Fou in Les Epesses.

Miss Universe 2021
Botino represented France at Miss Universe 2021. She was originally set to represent France at Miss Universe 2020, but due to potential date conflicts between Miss Universe 2021 and Miss France 2022, she was instead switched to Miss Universe 2021 while Petit competed at Miss Universe 2020. Botino tested positive for COVID-19 upon arriving at Miss Universe, and was taken to a government isolation hotel. She had been fully vaccinated, and had been tested upon departure. She was released from quarantine after ten days and was authorized to rejoin the competition.

Botino caused a sensation during the national costume competition with an outfit paying tribute to Josephine Baker, made of a set of rhinestone lingerie adorned with jewels and large feather wings. Her performance during the evening gown competition was less successful, since she tripped on the hem of her long dress during her way back. Botino ultimately placed in the top ten, the highest placement among the European candidates.

Miss World 2023
Botino will represent France at the 71st Miss World pageant.

References

External links

1997 births
Living people
French beauty pageant winners
French female models
Miss France winners
Paris-Sorbonne University alumni
French people of Guadeloupean descent
Guadeloupean people of Indian descent
Miss Universe 2021 contestants
Miss World 2022 delegates
Miss Guadeloupe winners